Jim Naureckas (born 1964 in Libertyville, Illinois) is the editor of Extra!, the magazine of FAIR (Fairness and Accuracy in Reporting).

He graduated from Stanford University in 1985 with a bachelor's degree in political science. He covered the Iran-Contra scandal for the magazine In These Times, and was managing editor of the Council on Hemispheric Affairs'  newsletter.

Naureckas became the editor of Extra! in 1990.  He is the co-author of The Way Things Aren't: Rush Limbaugh's Reign of Error (The New Press).  He co-edited The FAIR Reader: An Extra! Review of Press and Politics in the '90s (Westview Press). He is editor of the New York City fan site NYSonglines.com.

In 1997, he married Janine Jackson, the program director of FAIR.

References

External links

1964 births
Living people
Stanford University alumni
American people of Lithuanian descent
American male journalists
American alternative journalists
American media critics